The Gibson Thunderbird is an electric bass guitar made by Gibson and Epiphone.

Background and introduction
The Gibson Thunderbird was introduced in 1963. At the time, Fender had been the leader in the electric bass market since their introduction of the Precision Bass twelve years earlier.

The Thunderbird was designed by U.S. auto designer Raymond H. Dietrich (Chrysler, Lincoln, Checker) along with the Firebird guitar, which it resembles in design, construction, and name.

Design and construction

The Thunderbird bass, like the Rickenbacker 4000 series and the Firebird guitar designed concurrently, has neck-through construction: the neck wood runs the entire length of the body, with the rest of the body glued into place. Some cheaper Epiphone models feature a more conventional bolt-on neck construction.

The Thunderbird was Gibson's first model built in the 34-inch scale, which had been made popular by Fender. Previous models use the short scale of 30½ inches.

There were originally two Thunderbird models: the Thunderbird II, with only one pickup, and the Thunderbird IV, with two pickups. The Thunderbird usually features bass humbuckers, colloquially referred to as "soapbars" due to their appearance.

Non-reverse Thunderbirds 
In 1966, Gibson changed the Thunderbird's design and construction. The original Thunderbirds (and Firebirds) have a "reverse" body, with the treble horn extended and the bass horn recessed. Due to a lawsuit brought by Fender because of the resemblance to the Fender Jazzmaster, the body styles were modified, with the result being called the "non-reverse" body. Also, the expensive neck-through construction was replaced by traditional Gibson set-neck construction. The non-reverse Thunderbird was continued until 1969. Though fewer non-reverse Thunderbirds were shipped, the original reverse-body instruments retain a higher collectors' value. Gibson started producing the non-reverse Thunderbirds again for the public in late 2012.

1976–1979 reissue
The Thunderbird IV was reissued in 1976 as a bicentennial edition. This reissue featured the original body shape and neck-through construction but unlike the previous issues, the bicentennial edition included the new "three-point" bridge and a red, white, and blue Thunderbird logo. The bass was offered in tobacco burst, ebony, white, or natural finish. After the bicentennial, the Thunderbird was continued as a regular production model until 1979, when it was discontinued once again.

Current and recent models
The Thunderbird IV was re-introduced to the Gibson line in 1987 and was in regular production until 2015.

The most recent official Thunderbirds produced by Gibson Guitar Corporation:
Gibson USA Thunderbird IV 
Gibson USA Nikki Sixx Thunderbird Bass 
Epiphone Thunderbird IV
Epiphone Nikki Sixx Blackbird
Epiphone Goth Thunderbird IV 
Epiphone Special Run Thunderbird IV limited edition silverburst
Epiphone Thunderbird Pro IV
Epiphone Thunderbird Pro V
Epiphone Thunderbird Classic-IV Pro
Gibson Thunderbird non-reverse bass
Epiphone Thunderbird Vintage Pro

Features of current and recent models
The standard Gibson Thunderbird IV has a nine-ply mahogany-walnut neck-through with mahogany wings attached to form the body, and was offered in vintage sunburst or walnut finishes.

The Nikki Sixx Thunderbird bass has a mahogany-walnut neck-through with flame maple wings attached to form the body, finished in transparent black cherry. The fretboard is inlaid with red acrylic Xs at the third, fifth, seventh and twelfth frets.

The Gibson Thunderbird Studio models (which were also available as five-string versions) have mahogany necks set into mahogany bodies. This model was discontinued in 2007.

The Gibson Thunderbird IV zebra wood bass, 2007, limited run of 400 (Gibson guitar of the week, week 11)."ZebraBird"

Thunderbird short scale bass, 30.5 inch scale, 2011, limited run of 400.  "Short Scale Thunderbird"

The Epiphone Thunderbird IV, a budget alternative to the Gibson models, has a maple bolt-on construction onto a mahogany body, and is finished in vintage sunburst or ebony. It was produced from 1999 through 2021.

The Epiphone Goth Thunderbird is similar to the Epiphone Thunderbird IV. However, it has a mahogany body, a Celtic cross symbol on the pickguard, and is finished in a "pitch black" flat finish.

The Epiphone Nikki Sixx Blackbird is similar to the Epiphone Goth Thunderbird in build and appearance. However, in addition to the mahogany body, it has a slim profile mahogany neck, the fretboard is inlaid with white iron cross fret markers, the Thunderbird logo is overlaid on an iron cross for the symbol on the pickguard. It also features "Deep Sixx" humbucker pickups, an "Opti-Grab" handle on the tailpiece and an on-off switch instead of traditional volume-tone controls.

The Epiphone Thunderbird IV limited edition, a budget alternative to the Gibson models, has a maple neck bolted onto an alder body, Alpine white finish with black hardware and assembled at the Epiphone Custom Shop in Korea. This model is currently no longer produced. (Epiphone has had other runs of the LE in other colors, as well.)

The Epiphone Special Run Thunderbird-IV limited edition silverburst is also an Epiphone alternative to the Gibson model with a maple neck and rosewood fretboard bolted onto a mahogany body (as opposed to the standard Epiphone alder body) which gives it a much closer tonality to the Gibson Thunderbirds, which use mahogany as a major wood in the construction of the bass. Chrome hardware is used (tuners, pickup covers, bridge, and screws) as opposed to the standard Epiphone black hardware, differently-shaped pickups compared to the Epiphone and Gibson Thunderbirds (much closer to the "classic" pickups of the 1960s and 1970s) and a special "silverburst" finish.

The Epiphone Thunderbird Pro IV has a seven-piece (walnut-maple-walnut-maple-walnut-maple-walnut) neck with neck-through construction. It also has the Epiphone T-Pro bass humbucking pickups with custom active electronics and EQ.

The Epiphone Thunderbird Pro V is the five-string version of the Thunderbird Pro IV. It also has a seven-piece neck, a neck-through construction, Epiphone T-Pro pickups and active electronics.

The Epiphone Thunderbird Classic-IV Pro, is a neck-through, reverse design and features Gibson pickups. This bass has a darker tone, similar to modern Gibson Thunderbirds. The Classic Pro was quietly dropped from the Epiphone website around the 2020 NAMM show.

The Gibson Thunderbird non-reverse announced during 2012 features a choice of vintage sunburst or Pelham blue finishes, both in high-gloss nitrocellulose lacquer. 

The Epiphone Thunderbird Vintage Pro bass (Introduced in 2017) is a fairly accurate reproduction of the classic electric bass first introduced in 1963. Featuring ProBucker bass humbuckers and a vintage styled 1960s tune-o-matic bridge and claw tailpiece. The new Thunderbird vintage Pro was available in Alpine white, ebony, and tobacco sunburst.

In 2021, Gibson announced a new non-reverse Thunderbird, in Pelham Blue, Burgundy Red, and Inverness Green. The specs are close to those of the mid-60s non-reverse Thunderbirds, with some updates such as Hipshot Ultralite tuners.

At some point in 2021, without fanfare, Epiphone rebranded the Thunderbird Vintage Pro as the Thunderbird 60s bass and raised the price slightly. The specs appear to be the same as the Vintage Pro. The 60s Bass is only available in black and tobacco burst.

Fenderbird

The Who's John Entwistle used Thunderbird IVs from 1971 to 1974, but was dissatisfied with the necks. He bought several Thunderbird basses after the model was discontinued and gutted them. He then had several bodies cut to the original shape, attached Fender Precision Bass necks to them, and installed the salvaged hardware.

Notable Thunderbird players 

 Justin Chancellor of Tool plays a Thunderbird, which he used during the early years of the band.
 Les Claypool
 Calum Hood of 5 Seconds of Summer uses a Thunderbird, primarily on the Meet You There tour in 2018.
 Overend Watts of Mott The Hoople
 Glenn Cornick of Jethro Tull played several Gibson Thunderbird and non-reverse Thunderbird basses. His non-reverse Thunderbird bass was stolen while on tour in 1970.
 Kim Gordon of Sonic Youth used a sunburst 1976 Gibson Thunderbird Bass which she bought in 1988 and was also used frequently by her former husband and bandmate Thurston Moore. She stopped using it live in favour of her BC Rich during the Goo era, though it did show up at a few shows. It was used for the recording of "Dirty", however, and many 'Dirty' tour shows in '92. She also used it for the recording of "Sonic Nurse". Jim used it for the Nurse tour, and Kim revisited it for the entirety of the "Daydream Nation" shows they did, except for 'Eliminator' which she played on her EB bass. Still used on the Eternal tour.
 Krist Novoselic of Nirvana uses a Gibson Ripper bass and a Gibson Thunderbird bass.
 Duff McKagan of Guns N' Roses
 Nikki Sixx of Mötley Crüe
 Peter Hook of New Order
 Lemmy Kilmister of Motörhead and Hawkwind used a Thunderbird fairly much, but stopped using it in favor of his signature model Rickenbacker basses.
 Steve Harbin of Frech & Co uses a Thunderbird regularly.
 George "Pops" Chambers of The Chambers Brothers
 Michael Bradford
 Kim Deal of Pixies
 Adam Clayton of U2
 Nikki Monninger of Silversun Pickups, exclusively plays Gibson Thunderbirds except when she needs an acoustic bass.
 Héctor Mejía of Mr. Hectárea and Rigtus
 Jared Followill of Kings Of Leon
 Oscar Keating of Man-Eater Soup
 Tyson Ritter of The All American Rejects plays a Gibson Thunderbird bass. Ritter has stated that it is one of his favorite basses to play.
 Walter Becker of Steely Dan played a Gibson Thunderbird bass on the albums Can't Buy a Thrill and Countdown to Ecstasy.
 Jimmy Bain of Rainbow played a Gibson Thunderbird bass on the albums Rainbow Rising and Long Live Rock 'n' Roll.
 Pete Way used a Gibson Thunderbird bass during his tenures in Fastway and UFO.
 John Entwistle of The Who used various Gibson Thunderbird basses from 1971 to about 1976. His first bass was a non-reverse orange Thunderbird, and he also played at least 2 1964 Thunderbird basses, one of which was accidentally destroyed by Keith Moon at a concert in New York in 1971, and John subsequently damaged it. Bought at Sotheby's May 2003 auction for 28,800 GBP by David Swartz. It was display in October 2019 at the "Play It Loud" Exhibition at the Metropolitan Museum of Art in New York. Entwistle was once quoted as saying: "Once you turn up the treble on a Precision, the bottom drops out." "In big arenas, I wasn't getting enough bottom end from the P-Basses when I had the treble all the way up."
 Entwistle also played an instrument called a "Fenderbird", which used the maple neck of a CBS Fender Precision bass bolted onto a custom mahogany Thunderbird IV-clone body (slightly thicker than a standard Thunderbird IV body to accept the Fender bolt-on neck – possibly the same thickness as a Fender Precision; which improved the tone, according to Entwistle). It also used a Gibson Thunderbird bridge and electronics. The height-adjustment screws of the pickups were set slightly sunk into the pickup-covers by Peter Cook so that Entwistle would not tear his fingernails on them. Paxman designed cases specifically for the Fenderbirds.
 Leon Wilkeson, bassist for Lynyrd Skynyrd, played several Thunderbirds and a Fenderbird during his musical career, as well as various Fender basses.
 Allen Woody, bassist for The Allman Brothers Band, was an avid collector of Gibson Thunderbird and Epiphone Thunderbird basses. In 2011, Epiphone created a limited edition signature model Epiphone Allen Woody Thunderbird bass.
 Tom Hamilton of Aerosmith was known to use a white Gibson Thunderbird bass from 1973 to early 1977, rotating between the Thunderbird, a Fender Jazz Bass and a Fender Precision Bass, before using a sunburst Music Man StingRay by the time Draw the Line was released in 1977.
 Roger Glover of Deep Purple and Rainbow used a Gibson Thunderbird bass, which was used on the album Come Taste the Band in 1975 as well as the Rainbow album Down to Earth. The Thunderbird can also be seen in the video for the Rainbow single "Since You Been Gone".
 Stefan Olsdal of Placebo
Martin Turner of Wishbone Ash played a reverse Thunderbird IV.
 Margrét Rósa of Kælan Mikla has played several Thunderbird basses, including an Epiphone Goth and Vintage Pro.

References

External links
Gibson Blackbird– Information, and pictures of the Gibson Blackbird.

Thunderbird
1963 musical instruments